Johann Sebastian Bach composed the church cantata  (You shall love God, your Lord), 77 in Leipzig for the thirteenth Sunday after Trinity and first performed it on 22 August 1723.

The cantata text, written by Johann Oswald Knauer, is focused on the prescribed reading for the Sunday, the parable of the Good Samaritan  containing the Great Commandment, which is used as the text of the first movement. A pair of recitative and aria deals with the love of God, while a symmetrical pair deals with the love of the neighbour. Bach did not write the text of the closing chorale in the score, but probably his son Johann Christoph Friedrich Bach.

Bach scored the cantata for four vocal soloists, mixed choir, tromba da tirarsi, two oboes, strings and continuo. In the first movement Bach uses an instrumental quotation of Luther's hymn on the ten commandments, "" (These are the holy ten commandments), played by the trumpet in canon with the continuo.

History and words 
Bach wrote the cantata in 1723 in his first year as Thomaskantor in Leipzig for the 13th Sunday after Trinity. The prescribed readings for the Sunday were from the Epistle to the Galatians, Paul's teaching on law and promise, and from the Gospel of Luke, the parable of the Good Samaritan. The text relates closely to the readings, even to the situation in which the parable was told, referring to the question of a lawyer what needs to be done to achieve eternal life. The answer, which the lawyer had to give himself, was the commandment to love God and your neighbour. This, the Great Commandment, is the text of the first movement. Accordingly, the following text is divided in two parts, one recitative and aria dealing with the love of God, and a symmetrical part handling the love of the neighbour.

The cantata's last movement is a four-part harmonisation of the "Ach Gott, vom Himmel sieh darein" hymn tune: this tune, Zahn No. 4431, was first published in Erfurt in 1524 and is based on a pre–Reformation model. Bach did not write any lyrics for this movement in his autograph score. A later hand added the text of the eighth stanza of David Denicke's hymn "" (1657). Wilhelm Rust, who edited the cantata for the 19th-century Bach-Gesellschaft Ausgabe (BGA), considered this text as chosen by Karl Friedrich Zelter, but included it nonetheless in the published score. Werner Neumann did not think that the text of the concluding chorale was well-chosen, so for his presentation of the cantata in the 20th-century New Bach Edition (Neue Bach-Ausgabe, NBA) he replaced it by a stanza from Denicke's "" hymn (1657). In an article published in the 2001 volume of the Bach-Jahrbuch, Peter Wollny wrote that the handwriting of the last movement's lyrics in Bach's autograph was not Zelter's but probably that of Johann Christoph Friedrich, one of Bach's younger sons, who may have had access to the cantata's performing parts containing the lyrics as intended by the composer.

Bach led the Thomanerchor in the first performance of the cantata on 22 August 1723.

Music

Structure and scoring 
Bach structured the cantata in six movements with choral movements framing two pairs of recitative and aria. He scored it for four vocal soloists (soprano (S), alto (A), tenor (T) and bass (B)), a SATB mixed choir, and an orchestra of tromba da tirarsi (Baroque slide trumpet) (tir), two oboes (Ob), two violins (Vl), viola (Va), and basso continuo (Bc) including bassoon (Fg). The title of the autograph score reads "J.J. Concerto Dominica 13 p- Trinitatis" (J.J. concerto for the 13th a. Trinity, J.J. being short for Jesu juva (Jesus help).

Movements

1 
The first movement, "" (You shall love God, your Lord), carries Bach's statement on the most important law, on which, according to the parallel , "hang all the law and the prophets". The words translate to "You shall love God, your Lord, with all your heart, with all your soul, with all your strength and with all your mind, and your neighbor as yourself". Bach had enlarged on the "dualism of love of God and brotherly love" already in his monumental cantata in 14 movements, at the beginning of his first cycle. In order to show the law's universality, Bach introduces Martin Luther's chorale "" (These are the holy ten commandments), referring to the commandments of the Old Testament, as a foundation of the movement's structure. The tune is played in a strict canon, the most rigid musical law as one more symbol. The canon is performed  by the trumpet in the highest range, and the continuo, representing the lowest range. The tempo of the trumpet is twice as fast as the tempo of the continuo, therefore the trumpet has time to repeat first single lines and finally the complete melody of the chorale. The trumpet enters ten times, to symbolize once more the completeness of the law. The voices, representing the law of the New Testament, engage in imitation of a theme which is derived from the chorale tune and first played by the instruments. John Eliot Gardiner, who provides an extended analysis of the movement, concludes:

2 
A short secco recitative for bass, "" (So it must be! ), summarizes the ideas.

3 
An aria for soprano, "" (My God, I love You from my heart), is accompanied by two obbligato oboes which frequently play in tender third parallels.

4 
The second recitative for tenor, "" (Give me as well, my God! a Samaritan heart), is a prayer to grant a heart like the Samaritan's. It is intensified by the strings.

5 
The last aria for alto with an obbligato trumpet, "" (Ah, in my love there is still ), takes the form of a sarabande. Bach conveys the "" (imperfection) of human attempt to live by the law of love, by choosing the trumpet and composing for it "awkward intervals" and "wildly unstable notes" which would sound imperfect on the period's valveless instruments. In contrast, Bach wrote in the middle section a long trumpet solo of "ineffable beauty", as a "glorious glimpse of God's realm".

6 
The closing four-part chorale is a setting of the "Ach Gott, vom Himmel sieh darein" hymn tune. The cantata has been published with two variant versions of the chorale text:
 The BGA edition publishes the lyrics which another hand added to Bach's autograph, i.e. a stanza from Denicke's "" with the incipit "" (You, Lord Jesus, stand as a model of your love).
 The NBA publishes the lyrics according to its editor's suggestion: the stanza "" (Lord, dwell in me through faith) from Denicke's "".

Recordings 
The entries of the table are taken from the listing on the Bach Cantatas Website. Ensembles playing period instruments in historically informed performance are marked by green background.

References

External links 
 
 
 
 
 
 
 BWV 77 Du sollt Gott, deinen Herren, lieben English translation, University of Vermont

Church cantatas by Johann Sebastian Bach
1723 compositions